Statistics of Austrian Football Bundesliga in the 1995–96 season.

Overview 
It was contested by 10 teams, and SK Rapid Wien won the championship.

Teams and location

Teams of 1995–96 Austrian Football Bundesliga
FC Admira/Wacker
Austria Salzburg
Austria Wien
Grazer AK
LASK
Rapid Wien
SV Ried
Sturm Graz
Tirol Innsbruck
Vorwärts Steyr

League standings

Results
Teams played each other four times in the league. In the first half of the season each team played every other team twice (home and away), and then did the same in the second half of the season.

First half of season

Second half of season

Relegation play-offs

|}

Top goalscorers

References 
 Austria - List of final tables (RSSSF)

Austrian Football Bundesliga seasons
Aust
1995–96 in Austrian football